312 may refer to:

The year 312 AD
The year 312 BC
The number 312
China National Highway 312 (312国道), known as The Mother Road, a key east–west route running 4,967 km (3,086 mi) from Shanghai on the East China Sea to the western Chinese border with Kazakhstan in Central Asia.
One of several Ferrari racing cars with 3 litre 12-cylinder engines: 
The 312, 312B and 312T Formula One cars
The 312P and 312PB sportscar prototype class cars
The British Rail Class 312 EMU
The USS Young (DD-312) destroyer
The Chicago Loop area code 312.
312 Urban Wheat, a beer brewed by the Chicago-based Goose Island Brewery